Marouan Razine (born 9 April 1991) is a Moroccan-born male Italian long-distance runner, who won three Italian championships.

Achievements

National titles
 Italian Athletics Championships
 5000 m: 2014, 2015, 2018, 2019
 10 km road: 2016

See also
 Naturalized athletes of Italy

References

External links

1991 births
Living people
Italian male cross country runners
Italian male long-distance runners
Moroccan emigrants to Italy
Italian sportspeople of African descent
Naturalised citizens of Italy
Athletics competitors of Gruppo Sportivo Esercito
Italian Athletics Championships winners